Ichthyophis billitonensis, the Billiton Island caecilian, is a species of amphibians in the family Ichthyophiidae endemic to the Belitung island, Indonesia. Habitat requirements are unknown but it probably inhabits moist lowland forests. It may be threatened by habitat loss caused by opencast tin mining.

References

billitonensis
Amphibians described in 1965
Amphibians of Indonesia
Endemic fauna of Indonesia
Taxonomy articles created by Polbot